Farmen 2016 (The Farm 2016) is the ninth season of the Swedish version of The Farm reality television show. The season like last year takes place on a farm in Brandsjön in the municipality of Vaggeryd, Sweden where contestants live on and work on a farm like they did 100 year prior. The season premiered on TV4 on 10 January 2016 and concluded on 20 March 2016 where Fredrik Rosenkvist won against Lina Ilar in the final duel to win 500,000 kr. and the title of Farmen 2016.

Format
Sixteen contestants are chosen from the outside world. Each week one contestant is selected the Farmer of the Week. In the first week, the contestants choose the Farmer. Since week 2, the Farmer is chosen by the contestant evicted in the previous week.

Nomination process
The Farmer of the Week nominates two people (a man and a woman) as the Butlers. The others must decide which Butler is the first to go to the Battle. That person then chooses the second person (from the same sex) for the Battle and also the type of battle (a quiz, extrusion, endurance, sleight). The Battle winner must win two duels. The Battle loser is evicted from the game.

Finishing order
(ages stated are at time of contest)

The game

Notes

References

External links

The Farm (franchise)
2016 Swedish television seasons